Life guard or Life Guard may refer to:
 Life Guards
 Life Guards (Denmark)
 Life Guards (France)
 Life Guards (Sweden), 
 Life Guards (United Kingdom)
 Life Guards' Dragoon Music Corps
 Life Guards Jager Regiment (Russia)
 Life Guards of Horse
 Royal Bavarian Infantry Lifeguards Regiment
 Life Guard
 Life Guard DC
 Life Guard Horse Regiment

See also 
 Lifeguard, a rescuer at water-based activities
 Lifeguard (car safety), a car safety device
 Lifeguard (military), soldiers that protect a sovereign